Frankfurt Millennium is a 1998 drama film directed by Romuald Karmakar and starring Michael Degen, Manfred Zapatka and Jochen Nickel. Conceived as part of the 2000, Seen By... project, the film is a German and French co-production.

Plot
On New Year's Eve in 1999, a group of regulars meet at the Frankfurt Junction, a bar in Frankfurt. There, they engage in a conversation about why they are unhappy with their lives.

Cast
Michael Degen as Walter
Manfred Zapatka as Harry
Jochen Nickel as Mannie

Production
The French company Haut et Court's producers Caroline Benjo and Carole Scotta initiated 2000, Seen By..., to produce films depicting the approaching turn of the millennium seen from the perspectives of 10 different countries. Karmakar adapted the radio play Für eine Mark und Acht by Jörg Fauser for the project.

Reception
TV Spielfilm gave the film a positive review, citing its sarcasm and calling it dismal, in a nice way. Chicago Reader critic Ted Shen credited Karmakar with "efficiently pacing [characters'] monologues and dialogues while disclosing fine shades of surliness".

References

External links
 
Frankfurt Millenium at Haut et Court 

1998 films
1990s German-language films
Films set in Frankfurt
French drama films
German drama films
Films based on radio series
1990s German films
1990s French films
Films directed by Romuald Karmakar
Films set around New Year